Sir Pita Russell Sharples  (born Peter Russell Sharples, 20 July 1941) is a New Zealand Māori academic and politician, who was a co-leader of the Māori Party from 2004 to 2013, and a minister outside Cabinet in the National Party-led government from 2008 to 2014. He was the member of Parliament for the Tāmaki Makaurau electorate in Auckland from 2005 to 2014. He stepped down as co-leader role of the Māori Party in July 2013.

Early life
Sharples was born in Waipawa, a town in Hawke's Bay. His mother Ruiha was of Ngāti Kahungunu, and his father Paul was a shearer and a second generation New Zealander whose family came from Bolton, United Kingdom.

He received his early education at Waipukurau District High School, but then became a boarder at Te Aute College. His four years there culminated in his becoming head boy, and he credits this time as a turning point of his life. He then attended the University of Auckland, studying education. After graduating, he remained at the University as an instructor, working at the Faculty of Education. He subsequently gained an MA (1st class) in anthropology, and later a PhD in anthropology and linguistics – both also from the University of Auckland.

Sharples strongly opposed the construction of Auckland Thermal No. 1, a gas-fired power plant proposed for Te Atatū Peninsula. In 1973, the Third Labour Government of New Zealand abandoned plans for the plant after widespread opposition. During this period, Sharples was inspired to become more politically active, and soon after the scheme was abandoned he wrote a letter to Prime Minister Norman Kirk, explaining his reasons for opposing the plant.

Member of Parliament

In addition to his academic work, Sharples has long advocated a separate Māori political party. After the foreshore and seabed controversy in 2003–2004, Sharples joined forces with Tariana Turia a former minister in the Labour Party government who resigned over the issue. Turia and Sharples organised a new party based around Turia's Te Tai Hauāuru seat which was launched on 7 July 2004 as the Māori Party with Sharples as co-leader.

In the 2005 general election Sharples contested and won the urban Auckland seat of Tamaki Makaurau displacing former Labour MP John Tamihere.

Minister of Māori Affairs

In the 2008 general election Sharples was re-elected with a majority of more than 7000. The National Party won more seats overall and formed a minority government with support from the Māori Party, ACT New Zealand and United Future. Sharples was appointed as Minister of Māori Affairs, although like other support party members he remained outside Cabinet.
Sharples was returned to parliament in the 2011 general election, and retained the Māori Affairs portfolio.

Honours
Sharples was appointed a Commander of the Order of the British Empire, for services to the Māori people, in the 1990 Queen's Birthday Honours. In the 2015 Queen's Birthday Honours, he was appointed a Knight Companion of the New Zealand Order of Merit, for services as a Member of Parliament and to Māori.

References

External links 

 "Pita Sharples", TV documentary

|-

|- style="text-align: center;"

1941 births
Living people
New Zealand people of English descent
Māori Party MPs
New Zealand activists
Māori Party co-leaders
Ngāti Kahungunu people
University of Auckland alumni
Academic staff of the University of Auckland
People from Waipawa
People educated at Te Aute College
New Zealand MPs for Māori electorates
New Zealand Commanders of the Order of the British Empire
Members of the New Zealand House of Representatives
Government ministers of New Zealand
Knights Companion of the New Zealand Order of Merit
21st-century New Zealand politicians
New Zealand politicians awarded knighthoods